Bilopillya (Ukrainian: Білопілля) is a railway station in Bilopillya, Ukraine. It is a major passenger station on the Bilopillya-Basy line of the Sumy Directorate of Southern Railways.

History

On May 13, 1873, a project for the construction of the Merefa-Vorozhba railway line was approved.

On January 8, 1878, passenger and freight traffic was opened in the direction of Sumy from Bilopillya station to Merefa station.

On January 22, 1878, the movement of trains was opened on the Vorozhba - Bilopillya line.

On February 8, 1878, trains were opened through the entire Sumy line from Merefa station to Vorozhba station.

Passenger service

Passenger and suburban trains stop at Bilopillya station.

Notes

 Tariff Guide No. 4. Book 1 (as of 05/15/2021) (Russian) Archived 05/15/2021.
 Arkhangelsky A.S., Arkhangelsky V.A. in two books. - M.: Transport, 1981. (rus.)

References

External links

Bilopillya station on railwayz.info
Schedule for passenger trains and suburban trains
Bilopillya station on Photolines

Railway stations in Sumy Oblast
Buildings and structures in Sumy Oblast